Stadion Branko Čavlović-Čavlek is a football stadium in Karlovac, Croatia. It serves as home stadium for the NK Karlovac 1919 football club. The stadium was built in 1975 and has a capacity of 12,000 seats. Following NK Karlovac's promotion to Prva HNL the stadium underwent renovations in order to meet top-level requirements in the summer of 2009. The renovated stadium was opened on 19 July 2009 with a friendly match against Queens Park Rangers, which NK Karlovac won 3–1.

The stadium is named after Branko Čavlović (1933–1955), a footballer from Karlovac who was active with local clubs in the 1940s and competed for the Croatian national junior team of that period.

References 

Branko Cavlovic-Cavlek
Branko
Branko
NK Karlovac
Sport in Karlovac
Buildings and structures in Karlovac County